
Tanaga is a 5,924-foot (1,806 m) stratovolcano in the Aleutian Range of the U.S. state of Alaska. There have been three known eruptions since 1763. The most recent was in 1914 and produced lava flows. It sits west of another stratovolcano known as Mount Takawangha, which last erupted in 1550.

See also 

List of mountain peaks of North America
List of mountain peaks of the United States
List of mountain peaks of Alaska
List of Ultras of the United States
List of volcanoes in the United States

External links 

 Image of Tanaga

References 

Landforms of Aleutians West Census Area, Alaska
Mountains of Alaska
Volcanoes of Alaska
Aleutian Range
Stratovolcanoes of the United States
Mountains of Unorganized Borough, Alaska
Volcanoes of Unorganized Borough, Alaska
Holocene stratovolcanoes